Lebrija River is a river of northern Colombia. It originates in the Eastern Ranges of the Colombian Andes in Piedecuesta and flows through the northern part of the department of Santander into the Magdalena River in Puerto Wilches.

Etymology 
The Lebrija River is named after Antonio de Lebrija, the conquistador who discovered the river in 1529.

Description 

In the lower course of the river, it forms the natural boundary between Santander and Cesar, close to the border with Bolívar.

Geology 
The type locality of the Girón Formation was identified along the Lebrija River in 1954.

Climate 
The heavy rains over the capital district of Santander, the metropolitan area of Bucaramanga, have caused mortality of fish in the Lebrija River. The rainy seasons are March to May and September to November with drier periods from December to February and June to August.

Flora and fauna 

Many species of flora and fauna have been registered in the Lebrija River basin. A total number of 761 species of which 172 birds, 77 insects, 124 mammals, 104 fish and 284 plant species have been noted at Rionegro, Santander. The Cerulean Warbler Bird Reserve is close to the Lebrija River in Bucaramanga.

Flora 
The following species and genera are noted in the upper part of the Lebrija River: Ocotea sp., Miconia sp., Guarea grandifolia, Hedyosmum bomplandianum, Guateria sp., Protium sp., Ochroma sp., Piper sp., Trema micrantha, Vismia baccifera, Urera caracasana, Cecropia sp. and Croton leptostachis.

Fauna

Mammals 
The following mammals have been registered in the upper and central Lebrija River basins:

Amphibians and reptiles 
The following species have been registered in the central Lebrija River basin:

Birds 

The following species have been registered in the central Lebrija River basin:

Fish 

The following species have been registered in the central Lebrija River basin:

Trivia 
 In 1898, Princess Theresa of Bavaria made the first reported finding of an egg of the Magdalena River turtle (Podocnemis lewyana) near the Lebrija River

See also 

 List of rivers of Colombia
 Suárez River
 Chicamocha River, Sogamoso River

References

Bibliography

Further reading 
 
 

Rivers of Colombia
Geography of Santander Department
Geography of Cesar Department